Hǎi Qí may refer to:

 Jiang Haiqi, a Chinese Olympic swimmer
 Chinese cruiser Hǎi Qí, a protected cruiser in the Chinese fleet
 ''Hǎi Qí' class cruiser, a pair of protected cruisers